Centreville Historic District is a national historic district located at Centreville, New Castle County, Delaware.  It encompasses 15 contributing buildings and were built between 1820 and 1920.  It is primarily a residential district.  Notable buildings include the Dr. Joseph H. Chandler House, Chandler-Dixon House, Nichols House, the M. J. Furey House, the R. T. Carey House, the Rev. D. W. Moore House, the Mrs. R. Todd House, and the Odd Fellows Hall.

It was listed on the National Register of Historic Places in 1983.

References

Houses on the National Register of Historic Places in Delaware
Historic districts on the National Register of Historic Places in Delaware
Houses in New Castle County, Delaware
Historic districts in New Castle County, Delaware
National Register of Historic Places in New Castle County, Delaware